Falquet (or Folquet) de Romans (fl. 1215–1233) was the most famous troubadour attached to the court of Frederick II, Holy Roman Emperor, where he garnered a high reputation despite the fact that his career began as a jongleur. His surviving work consists of fourteen or fifteen pieces: seven sirventes (two religious and two canso sirventes as well as one Crusade song), three tensos (each two coblas long), two or three cansos on courtly love, a salut d'amor (or epistola) of 254 lines, and a religious alba. His poetry is, in general, clear and elegant, and he was apparently very religious.

Falquet was originally from Romans d'Isèra, a birthplace shared by the trobairitz Bieiris de Romans. According to his vida he was "at ease in the courts and of pleasant conversation. . . well-honoured among high society."

Career in Italy and Provence
Falquet spent much of his career in Italy. Sometime before December 1220, he wrote the homesick Una chanso sirventes from Montferrat and addressed it to his lady across the Alps. He confessed to being unable to cease thinking pus parti de Vianes ("the greater part about Viennois"). Besides the court of Montferrat, there are allusions in Peire de la Mula which may place Falquet at the court of Ottone del Carretto as well. It was probably there, between 1220 and 1226, that he wrote his sirventes urging the emperor to "rescue" the Holy Land.

Falquet was in communication with the trouvère Hugues IV de Berzé (N'Ugo de Bersie) who wrote a poem to Falquet (calling him Fouquet or Fouquez) asking him to join him on an imminent Crusade outra mar (overseas). Hugues's poem was sent with the jongleur Bernart (or Bernarz) d'Argentau. It is rife with information about the poets. According to Hugues, neither he nor Falquet were young at the time. Indeed, he was dead by August 1220, which provides an ante quem date for the poem. Hugues also states that Falquet had once been a jongleur, a detail also furnished by Falquet's vida. Though the poetic exchange had been dated to 1201 or November 1220–September 1221, the former date is too early and the latter invalidated by Hugues's death. Recently, dates of 1215, 1216, 1217, and 1219 have been proffered. Hugue's poem, written in Old French, is preserved in the chansonniers with an Occitan razo.

Falquet was back in Provence in 1226–1228, when he wrote a tenso, En chantan volh quem digatz, with Blacatz. This is the only tenso he composed outside of Italy, where he composed with Nicoletto da Torino (Nicolet, gran malenansa) and the Count of Biandrate (Pois vezem qu'el tond e pela). In 1228 Falquet was back in Italy, where he composed a song mentioning the departure of Frederick II on the Sixth Crusade.

Poetry
Connexion to chivalric romance
Falquet was very learned and well-read. References to contemporary literature (primarily chivalric romance) abound in his poetry. In his Ma bella domna, per vos dei esser gais he references Floire et Blancheflor (the former whom he calls Flori), the Roman d'Andrieu de Fransa, and the Raoul de Cambrai. On two other occasions he was given to referencing Floire et Blancheflor and in his 254-line letter he refers to the Roman de Renart and Tristans and Ysout. Elsewhere he refers to the latter as Tristanz and Ysolt.

Religion
In total, Falquet composed three religious songs, two sirventes, and one famous alba. This last, Vers Dieu, el vostre nom e de Sancta Maria, was addressed to God and the Virgin Mary. It ends on the high note of a sunrise (alba):

Politics
Of Falquet's political views very little would be known if he had not left behind a sirventes written against the rich and powerful which contains a prescription for socio-political reform:

Besides this one clear statement, Falquet composed other sirventes joglarescs (attacks/insult on jongleurs, often in the manner of jongleurs) in order, so his vida puts it, "to praise the good and to blame the bad."

Crusades
In the early 1220s Falquet had urged the emperor his patron to go on Crusade and in 1228 he mentioned his departure. In between he wrote Quan lo dous temps ven e vai la freidors, one of the most powerful Crusade songs ever written. The central theme of the work is the tumult of Europe engulphed in a conflict between the Papacy and the Emperor and the Albigensian Crusade.

References
Bibliography

Bertoni, Giulio. I Trovatori d'Italia: Biografie, testi, tradizioni, note. Rome: Società Multigrafica Editrice Somu, 1967 [1915]. 
Gaunt, Simon, and Kay, Sarah. "Appendix I: Major Troubadours" (pp. 279–291). The Troubadours: An Introduction. Simon Gaunt and Sarah Kay, edd. Cambridge: Cambridge University Press, 1999. .
Puckett, Jaye. "Reconmenciez novele estoire: The Troubadours and the Rhetoric of the Later Crusades." MLN, Vol. 116, No. 4, French Issue. (Sep., 2001), pp. 844–889. 
Riquer, Martín de. Los trovadores: historia literaria y textos. 3 vol. Barcelona: Planeta, 1975. 
The Vidas of the Troubadours. Margarita Egan, trans. New York: Garland, 1984. .

External links
Lyric allusions to the crusades and the Holy Land

Notes

13th-century Italian troubadours
People from Drôme